Fatsia is a small genus of three species of evergreen shrubs in the family Araliaceae native to southern Japan and Taiwan. They typically have stout, sparsely branched stems bearing spirally-arranged, large leathery, palmately lobed leaves 20–50 cm in width, on a petiole up to 50 cm long, and small creamy-white flowers in dense terminal compound umbels in late autumn or early winter, followed by small black fruit.  The genus was formerly classified within a broader interpretation of the related genus Aralia.

Species

A sterile hybrid between Fatsia japonica and Hedera hibernica, named × Fatshedera lizei, has been produced in cultivation in western Europe in both plain green and variegated forms.

Some species formerly included in Fatsia are now classified in other genera.  Fatsia papyrifera is now Tetrapanax papyrifer and Fatsia horrida is now Oplopanax horridus.

References

External links 
 Photos of various Fatsia forms and species for comparison

 
Apiales genera
Taxa named by Jules Émile Planchon
Taxa named by Joseph Decaisne